Simon Tisdall (born 1953) is a columnist for The Guardian newspaper and an assistant editor of the publication.

Early life
Tisdall was born in Manchester and educated at Holland Park School in Kensington, one of the first comprehensives. From 1971 to 1974, he studied history, politics and philosophy at Downing College, Cambridge.

Career

He joined The Guardian in 1979. From 1989–94, he was the newspaper's US Editor and White House correspondent. From 1994–98, he was Foreign Editor. During 1996–98, he was the Foreign Editor of The Observer.

Political positions
Tisdall has criticised Britain's close ties with Saudi Arabia and British involvement in the Saudi Arabian-led intervention in Yemen. In 2018, he wrote that "the UK-Saudi alliance is pernicious, encouraging the worst in both sides, and deeply corrosive of 'our values'. May’s main focus is not on the unnumbered Yemeni civilians who continue to die as a result of the Saudi-led, British-backed bombing campaign." Tisdall commends Angela Merkel's "brave, open-door migration policy".

Tisdall is a proponent of regime change as a political and military tool of Western bloc countries to enforce a change of government or leadership in an opposing or designated enemy country. 

Tisdall wrote that Ethiopia's Prime Minister Abiy Ahmed "should hand back his Nobel Peace Prize over his actions in the breakaway region" of Tigray.

In 2022, following the Russian invasion of Ukraine, Tisdall called for reforms to the United Nations which included an increase in the number of members of the United Nations Security Council and an end to the permanent members' right of veto.

Personal life
He married Alison Kane in 1984 in Ross-on-Wye in Herefordshire. They live a few miles west of Bradford on Avon in Wiltshire.

References

External links
 Guardian profile

1953 births
Living people
Alumni of Downing College, Cambridge
English male journalists
People from Bradford-on-Avon
The Guardian journalists
The Observer people
People educated at Holland Park School